This is a list of mountain passes and hills in the Tour de France. Among the passes most often crossed, Col du Tourmalet, Col d'Aubisque, Col d'Aspin, Col de Peyresourde and Col du Galibier predominate, while the highest peak ever reached is Cime de la Bonette-Restefond, used in the 1962, 1964, 1993 and 2008 Tour de France.

The highest mountain finishes in the history of the Tour were Galibier (2,645 m (8,677 ft)) in 2011; previously this had been Val Thorens in 1994; and before that Col du Granon used in 1986 and 2022.

Editions

2001
The 2001 Tour de France included 19 mountain passes or summit finishes, categorized HC, 1, or 2.

Stage 6
Category 2 – Col du Donon (0,727m)

Stage 7
Category 2 – Col d'Adelspach (0,850 m)
Category 2 – Col du Calvaire (1,135 m)

Stage 10
Category H – Col de la Madeleine (2,000 m)
Category H – Col du Glandon (1,924m)
Category H – Alpe d'Huez (1,850 m)

Stage 11
Category H – Chamrousse (1,730 m)

Stage 12
Category 1 – Col de Jau (1,506 m)
Category 2 – Col de Coudons (0,883 m)
Category 1 – Ax-les-Thermes (1,375 m)

Stage 13

Category 2 – Col de Portet d'Aspet (1,069 m)
Category 1 – Col de Menté (1,349 m)
Category 1 – Col du Portillon (1,320 m)
Category 1 – Col de Peyresourde (1,569 m)
Category 1 – Col de Val Louron-Azet (1,580 m)
Category H – Pla d'Adet (1,680 m)

Stage 14
Category 1 – Col d'Aspin (1,489 m)
Category H – Col du Tourmalet (2,115 m)
Category H – Luz Ardiden (1,715 m)

2002
The 2002 Tour de France included 21 mountain passes or summit finishes, categorized HC, 1, or 2.

Stage 11
Category H – Col d'Aubisque (1,709 m)
Category 1 – La Mongie (1,715 m)

Stage 12
Category 1 – Col de Menté (1,350 m)
Category 2 – Col de Portet d'Aspet (1,069 m)
Category 1 – Col de la Core (1,395 m)
Category 2 – Col de Port (1,249 m)
Category H – Plateau de Beille (1,780 m)

Stage 14
Category H – Mont Ventoux (1,912 m)

Stage 15
Category 2 – Col de Grimone (1,318 m)
Category 2 – Col d'Ornon (1,371 m)
Category 1 – Les Deux Alpes (1,650 m)

Stage 16
Category H – Col du Galibier (2,645 m)
Category H – Col de la Madeleine (2,000 m)
Category H – La Plagne (1,880 m)

Stage 17
Category 1 – Cormet de Roselend (1,968 m)
Category 1 – Col des Saisies (1,650 m)
Category 2 – Col des Aravis (1,498 m)
Category 1 – Col de la Colombière (1,618m)

Stage 18
Category 1 – Col de Richemond (1,060 m)
Category 2 – Col du Berthiand (0,780 m)

2003
The 2003 Tour de France included 22 mountain passes or summit finishes, categorized HC, 1, or 2.

Stage 7
Category 2 – Col de Portes (1,020 m)
Category 2 – Col du Mont des Princes (0,696 m)
Category 1 – Col de la Ramaz (1,619 m)

Stage 8
Category 2 – Col du Télégraphe (1,566 m)
Category H – Col du Galibier (2,645 m)
Category H – Alpe d'Huez (1,850 m)

Stage 9
Category 1 – Col du Lautaret (2,058 m)
Category H – Col d'Izoard (2,360m)
Category 2 – Côte de Saint-Apollinaire (1,263 m)

Stage 13
Category 1 – Port de Pailhères (2,001 m)
Category 1 – Ax 3 Domaines (1,372 m)

Stage 14
Category 2 – Col de Latrape (1,110 m)
Category 1 – Col de la Core (1,395 m)
Category 2 – Col de Portet d'Aspet (1,069 m)
Category 1 – Col de Menté (1,349 m)
Category 1 – Col du Portillon (1,320 m)
Category 1 – Col de Peyresourde (1,563 m)

Stage 15
Category 1 – Col d'Aspin (1,489 m)
Category H – Col du Tourmalet (2,114 m)
Category H – Luz Ardiden (1,715 m)

Stage 16
Category 1 – Col du Soudet (1,540 m)
Category 1 – Col Bagargui (1,327 m)

2004
The 2004 Tour de France included 22 mountain passes or summit finishes, categorized HC, 1, or 2.

Stage 10
Category 2 – Col de Néronne (1,242 m)
Category 1 – Col du pas de Peyrol (1,589 m)
Category 2 – Col de Prat de Bouc (1,392 m)

Stage 11
Category 2 – Côte de Montsalvy (0,725 m)

Stage 12
Category 1 – Col d'Aspin (1,489 m)
Category 1 – La Mongie (1,715 m)

Stage 13
Category 2 – Col de Portet d'Aspet (1,069 m)
Category 1 – Col de la Core (1,395 m)
Category 2 – Col de Latrape (1,111 m)
Category 1 – Col d'Agnes (1,570 m)
Category H – Plateau de Beille (1,780 m)

Stage 15
Category 2 – Col des Limouches (1,075 m)
Category 1 – Col de l'Écharasson (1,146 m)
Category 2 – Col de Chalimont (1,374 m)
Category 2 – Villard-de-Lans - Côte 2000 (1,150 m)

Stage 16
Category H – Alpe d'Huez (1,850 m)

Stage 17
Category 1 – Col du Glandon (1,924 m)
Category H – Col de la Madeleine (2.001 m)
Category 2 – Col de Tamié (0,907 m)
Category 1 – Col de la Forclaz (1,157 m)
Category 1 – Col de la Croix Fry (1,477 m)

Stage 18
Category 2 – Col de la Faucille (1,320 m)

2005
The 2005 Tour de France included 23 mountain passes or summit finishes, categorized HC, 1, or 2.

Stage 8
Category 2 – Col de la Schlucht (1,139 m)

Stage 9
Category 2 – Col du Grand Ballon (1,338 m)
Category 1 – Col du Ballon d'Alsace (1,171m)

Stage 10
Category 1 – Cormet de Roselend (1,968 m)
Category 1 – Courchevel (2,004 m)

Stage 11
Category H – Col de la Madeleine (2,000 m)
Category 1 – Col du Télégraphe (1,566 m)
Category H – Col du Galibier (2,645 m)

Stage 12
Category 2 – Col Saint-Jean (1,332 m)
Category 2 – Col du Corobin (1,230 m)

Stage 14
Category H – Port de Pailhères (2,001 m)
Category 1 – Ax 3 Domaines (1,372 m)

Stage 15
Category 2 – Col de Portet d'Aspet (1,069 m)
Category 1 – Col de Menté (1,349 m)
Category 1 – Col du Portillon (1,320 m)
Category 1 – Col de Peyresourde (1,569 m)
Category 1 – Col de Val Louron-Azet (1,580 m)
Category H – Saint-Lary Pla d'Adet (1,669 m)

Stage 16
Category 1 – Col de Marie-Blanque (1,035 m)
Category H – Col d'Aubisque (1,677 m)

Stage 18
Category 2 – Côte de Boyne (0,930 m)
Category 2 – Côte de la Croix Neuve (0,924 m)

Stage 19
Category 2 – Col des Pradeaux (1,196 m)

2006
The 2006 Tour de France included 22 mountain passes or summit finishes, categorized HC, 1, or 2.

Stage 10
Category H – Col du Soudet 
Category 1 – Col de Marie-Blanque

Stage 11
Category H – Col du Tourmalet
Category 1 – Col d'Aspin
Category 1 – Col de Peyresourde
Category 1 – Col du Portillon
Category 1 – Puerto de Beret

Stage 12
Category 2 – Col des Ares

Stage 14
Category 2 – Col de Perty
Category 2 – Col de la Sentinelle

Stage 15
Category H – Col d'Izoard
Category 2 – Col du Lautaret
Category H – Alpe d'Huez

Stage 16
Category H – Col du Galibier
Category H – Col de la Croix de Fer
Category 2 – Col du Mollard
Category 1 – La Toussuire

Stage 17
Category 1 – Col des Saisies
Category 2 – Col des Aravis
Category 1 – Col de la Colombière
Category H – Col de Joux-Plane

Stage 18
Category 2 – Côte de Chambod

2007
The 2007 Tour de France included 22 mountain passes or summit finishes, categorized HC, 1, or 2.

In 2007, the Tour had a stage finish at the summit of Col d'Aubisque for the first time.

Stage 5
Category 2 – Haut-Folin

Stage 7
Category 1 – Col de la Colombière

Stage 8
Category 2 – Col de Tamié
Category 1 – Cormet de Roselend
Category 1 – Montée d'Hauteville
Category 1 – Montée de Tignes

Stage 9
Category H – Col de l'Iseran
Category 1 – Col du Télégraphe
Category H – Col du Galibier

Stage 12
Category 2 – Montée de la Jeante

Stage 14
Category 2 – Côte de St-Saraille
Category H – Port de Pailhères
Category H – Plateau de Beille

Stage 15
Category 2 – Col de Port
Category 2 – Col de Portet d'Aspet
Category 1 – Col de Menté
Category H – Port de Balès
Category 1 – Col de Peyresourde

Stage 16
Category H – Port de Larrau
Category 1 – Col de la Pierre St Martin
Category 1 – Col de Marie-Blanque
Category H – Col d'Aubisque

2008
The 2008 Tour de France included 17 mountain passes or summit finishes, categorized HC, 1, or 2.

Stage 6
Category 2 – Col de la Croix-Morand 
Category 2 – Super Besse

Stage 7
Category 2 – Col d'Entremont
Category 2 – Pas de Peyrol

Stage 9
Category 1 – Col de Peyresourde
Category 1 – Col d'Aspin

Stage 10
Category H – Col du Tourmalet
Category H – Hautacam

Stage 11
Category 1 – Col de Portel

Stage 15
Category H – Col Agnel
Category 1 – Prato Nevoso

Stage 16
Category H – Col de la Lombarde
Category H – Cime de la Bonette-Restefond

Stage 17
Category H – Col du Galibier
Category H – Col de la Croix de Fer
Category H – Alpe d'Huez

Stage 18
Category 2 – Croix de Montvieux

2009
The 2009 Tour de France included 21 mountain passes or summit finishes, categorized HC, 1, or 2. Seven of them were situated in the Pyrenees, three in the Vosges, nine in the Alps, one in the Ardèche and one in the Pre-Alps:

Stage 7 
Category 1 – Col de Serra-Seca 
Category H – Andorre Arcalis

Stage 8
Category 1 – Port d'Envalira
Category 2 – Col de Port
Category 1 – Col d'Agnes

Stage 9
Category 1 – Col d'Aspin
Category H – Col du Tourmalet

Stage 13 
Category 2 – Col de la Schlucht
Category 1 – Col du Platzerwasel 
Category 2 – Col du Firstplan

Stage 15 
Category 2 – Col des Mosses
Category 1 – Verbier

Stage 16
Category H – Col du Grand-Saint-Bernard
Category 1 – Col du Petit-Saint-Bernard

Stage 17
Category 1 – Cormet de Roselend
Category 1 – Col des Saisies
Category 2 – Côte d'Araches
Category 1 – Col de Romme
Category 1 – Col de la Colombière

Stage 19 
Category 2 – Col de l'Escrinet

Stage 20 
Category H – Mont Ventoux

2010
The 2010 Tour de France included 23 mountain passes or summit finishes, categorized HC, 1, or 2. One of them were situated in the Jura, eight in the Alps, two in the Cévennes, and twelve in the Pyrenees:

Stage 7 
Category 2 – Côte du barrage de Vouglans
Category 2 – Col de la Croix de la Serra
Category 2 – Côte de Lamoura

Stage 8 
Category 1 – Col de la Ramaz 
Category 1 – Morzine-Avoriaz

Stage 9 
Category 1 – Col de la Colombière
Category 2 – Col des Aravis
Category 1 – Col des Saisies
Category H – Col de la Madeleine

Stage 10
Category 1 – Côte de Laffrey 
Category 2 – Col du Noyer

Stage 12 
Category 2 – Suc de Montivernoux 
Category 2 – Côte de la Croix Neuve (Montée Laurent Jalabert)

Stage 14
Category H – Port de Pailhères
Category 1 – Ax 3-Domaines

Stage 15 
Category 2 – Col de Portet d'Aspet
Category 2 – Col des Ares
Category H – Port de Balès

Stage 16
Category 1 – Col de Peyresourde
Category 1 – Col d'Aspin
Category H – Col du Tourmalet
Category H – Col d'Aubisque

Stage 17 
Category 1 – Col de Marie-Blanque
Category 1 – Col du Soulor
Category H – Col du Tourmalet (Souvenir Henri Desgrange)

2011
The 2011 Tour de France included 23 mountain passes or summit finishes, categorized HC, 1, or 2. Four of them are situated in the Massif Central, nine in the Pyrenees, and ten in the Alps:

Stage 8
Category 2 – Col de la Croix Saint-Robert

Stage 9
Category 2 –  Col du pas de Peyrol (Puy Mary)
Category 2 –  Col du Perthus
Category 2 –  Col de Prat de Bouc (Plomb du Cantal)

Stage 12
Category 1 –  La Hourquette d'Ancizan
Category H –  Col du Tourmalet
Category H –  Luz-Ardiden

Stage 13
Category H – Col d'Aubisque

Stage 14
Category 2 –  Col de Portet d'Aspet
Category 1 –  Col de la Core
Category 2 –  Col de Latrape
Category 1 –  Col d'Agnes 
Category H –  Plateau de Beille

Stage 16
Category 2 –  Col de Manse

Stage 17
Category 2 –  Col de Montgenèvre
Category 1 –  Sestrières
Category 2 –  Côte de Pramartino

Stage 18
Category H –  Col Agnel
Category H –  Col d'Izoard
Category H –  Galibier (Serre Chevalier)

Stage 19
Category 1 –  Col du Télégraphe
Category H –  Col du Galibier
Category H –  Alpe d'Huez

2012
The 2012 tour included three uphill finishes: La Planche des Belles Filles (stage 7), La Toussuire - Les Sybelles (stage 11) and Peyragudes (stage 17).  The Col du Grand Colombier was included for the first time, and was among six Hors catégorie rated climbs in the Alps and Pyrenees.

Stage 7
Category 1 –  La Planche des Belles Filles (1035 m)

Stage 8
Category 2 – Côte de Maison-Rouge (784 m)
Category 2 – Côte de Saignelégier (979 m)
Category 2 – Côte de Saulcy (928 m)
Category 2 – Côte de la Caquerelle (834 m) 
Category 1 – Col de la Croix (789 m)

Stage 10    
Category 2 – Côte de Corlier (762 m)
Category H – Col du Grand Colombier (1501 m)

Stage 11  
Category H – Col de la Madeleine (1993 m)
Category H – Col de la Croix de Fer (2067 m)
Category 2 – Col du Mollard (1638 m)
Category 1 – Les Sybelles (1705 m)

Stage 12  
Category 1 – Col du Grand Cucheron (1188 m)
Category 1 – Col du Granier (1134 m)

Stage 14  
Category 2 – Col du Portel (601 m)
Category 1 – Port de Lers (1517 m)
Category 1 – Mur de Péguère (1375 m)

Stage 16  
Category H – Col d'Aubisque (1709 m)
Category H – Col du Tourmalet (2115 m)
Category 1 – Col d'Aspin (1489 m)
Category 1 – Col de Peyresourde (1559 m)

Stage 17  
Category 1 – Col de Menté (1349 m)
Category 2 – Col des Ares (797 m)
Category H – Port de Balès (1755 m)
Category 1 – Peyragudes (1603 m)

2013

The 2013 Tour de France  included 28 climbs ranked Category 2 or higher of which seven were Hors catégorie climbs, eight Category 1 and thirteen were Second Category. There were four "mountain top" finishes: at Ax 3 Domaines in the Pyrenees, Mont Ventoux in Provence, and Alpe d'Huez and Annecy-Semnoz in the Alps. Alpe d'Huez was used twice on stage 18, both times ranked Hors catégorie.

Stage 2 
 Category 2 – Col de Vizzavona (1163 m)

Stage 3 
 Category 2 – Col de Marsolino (443 m)

Stage 7 
 Category 2 – Col de la Croix de Mounis (809 m)

Stage 8 
 Category H – Port de Pailhères (2001 m) (Souvenir Henri Desgrange)
 Category 1 – Ax 3 Domaines (1350 m)

Stage 9 
 Category 2 – Col de Portet d'Aspet (1069 m)
 Category 1 – Col de Menté (1349 m)
 Category 1 – Col de Peyresourde (1569 m)
 Category 1 – Col de Val Louron-Azet (1580 m)
 Category 1 – La Hourquette d'Ancizan (1564 m)

Stage 15 
 Category H – Mont Ventoux (1912 m)

Stage 16 
 Category 2 – Col de Macuègne (1068 m)
 Category 2 – Col de Manse (1268 m)

Stage 17 
 Category 2 – Côte de Puy-Sanières (1173 m)
 Category 2 – Côte de Réallon (1227 m)

Stage 18  
 Category 2 – Col de Manse (1268 m)
 Category 2 – Col d'Ornon (1371 m)
 Category H – Alpe d'Huez (1765 m)
 Category 2 – Col de Sarenne (1999 m)
 Category H – Alpe d'Huez (1850 m)

Stage 19  
 Category H – Col du Glandon (1924 m)
 Category H – Col de la Madeleine (2000 m)
 Category 2 – Col de Tamié (907 m)
 Category 1 – Col de l'Épine (947 m) 
 Category 1 – Col de la Croix Fry (1477 m)

Stage 20  
 Category 2 – Côte du Puget (796 m)
 Category 1 – Mont Revard (1463 m)
 Category H – Annecy-Semnoz (1655 m)

2014 
The 2014 Tour de France  includes 25 climbs ranked Category 2 or higher of which six are Hors catégorie climbs, eleven Category 1 and eight are Second Category. There are seven "mountain top" finishes: at La Mauselaine (Category 3) and La Planche des Belles Filles in the Vosges, Chamrousse and Risoul in the Alps, and Saint-Lary Pla d'Adet and Hautacam in the Pyrenees.

Stage 2  
Category 2 – Côte de Holme Moss (521 m)

Stage 8  
Category 2 – Col de la Croix des Moinats (885 m)
Category 2 – Col de Grosse Pierre (901 m)

Stage 9  
Category 2 – Col de la Schlucht (1140 m) 
Category 2 – Côte de Gueberschwihr (559 m)
Category 1 – Le Markstein (1183 m)

Stage 10  
Category 2 – Col du Firstplan (722 m)
Category 1 – Col du Petit Ballon (1163 m)  
Category 1 – Col du Platzerwasel (1182 m) 
Category 2 – Col d'Oderen (884 m)  
Category 1 – Col des Chevrères (914 m) 
Category 1 – La Planche des Belles Filles (1035 m)

Stage 13  
Category 1 – Col de Palaquit (1154 m) 
Category H – Chamrousse (1730 m)

Stage 14  
Category 1 – Col du Lautaret (2058 m) 
Category H – Col d'Izoard (2360 m) 
Category 1 – Risoul (1855 m)

Stage 16  
Category 2 – Col de Portet d'Aspet (1069 m) 
Category H – Port de Balès (1755 m)

Stage 17  
Category 1 – Col du Portillon (1292 m)
Category 1 – Col de Peyresourde (1569 m)
Category 1 – Col de Val Louron-Azet (1580 m) 
Category H – Saint-Lary Pla d'Adet (1680 m)

Stage 18   
Category H – Col du Tourmalet (2115 m) 
Category H – Hautacam (1520 m)

2015 
The 2015 Tour de France includes 25 climbs ranked Category 2 or higher of which 7 are Hors catégorie climbs, 6 Category 1 and 12 are Second Category.

Stage 10  
Category H – Col de la Pierre St Martin (1610 m)

Stage 11  
Category 1 – Col d'Aspin (1490 m)
Category H – Col du Tourmalet (2115 m)

Stage 12  
Category 2 – Col de Portet d'Aspet (1069 m)  
Category 1 – Col de la Core (1395 m)
Category 1 – Port de Lers (1517 m)
Category H – Plateau de Beille (1780 m)

Stage 14  
Category 2 – Côte de Sauveterre (1014 m)
Category 2 – Côte de la Croix Neuve (1055 m)

Stage 15  
Category 2 – Col de l'Escrinet (787 m)

Stage 16  
Category 2 – Col de Cabre (1180 m) 
Category 2 – Col de Manse (1268 m)

Stage 17  
Category 2 – Col de la Colle (1431 m) 
Category 1 – Col d'Allos (2250 m)
Category 2 – Pra-Loup (1620 m)

Stage 18  
Category 2 – Col Bayard (1264 m)
Category 2 – Col de la Morte (1368 m)
Category H – Col du Glandon (1924 m) 
Category 2 – Lacets de Montvernier (782 m)

Stage 19  
Category 1 – Col du Chaussy (1533 m)
Category H – Col de la Croix de Fer (2067 m)
Category 2 – Col du Mollard (1638 m) 
Category 1 – La Toussuire (1705 m)

Stage 20  
Category H – Col de la Croix de Fer (2067 m)
Category H – Alpe d'Huez (1850 m)

2016 
The 2016 Tour de France includes 28 mountain passes or summit finishes, categorized HC, 1, or 2.

Stage 5  
Category 2 – Pas de Peyrol (1,589 m)
Category 2 – Col du Perthus (1,309 m)

Stage 7  
Category 1 – Col d'Aspin (1,489 m)

Stage 8  
Category H – Col du Tourmalet (2,115 m)  
Category 1 – La Hourquette d'Ancizan (1,564 m)
Category 1 – Col de Val Louron-Azet (1,580 m)
Category 1 – Col de Peyresourde (1,569 m)

Stage 9  
Category 1 – Port de la Bonaigua (2,072 m)
Category 1 – Port del Cantó (1,721 m)  
Category 1 – Côte de la Comella (1,347 m)
Category 1 – Col de Beixalis (1,796 m)  
Category H – Andorre Arcalis (2,240 m)

Stage 10  
Category 1 – Port d'Envalira (2,408 m)

Stage 12  
 Category H – Mont Ventoux (1,912 m)

Stage 15  
Category 2 – Col du Berthiand (780 m) 
Category 2 – Col du Sappel (794 m) 
Category H – Grand Colombier (1,501 m) 
Category 2 – Lacets du Grand Colombier (891 m)

Stage 17  
 Category 1 – Col de la Forclaz (1,527 m) 
 Category H – Finhaut - Émosson (1,929 m)

Stage 19  
Category 1 – Col de la Forclaz de Montmin (1,157m)
Category 2 – Col de la Forclaz de Queige (870 m)
Category H – Montée de Bisanne (1,723 m) 
Category 1 – Saint–Gervais Mont Blanc (1,372 m)

Stage 20  
Category 2 – Col des Aravis (1,487 m)
Category 1 – Col de la Colombière (1,613 m)
Category 1 – Col de la Ramaz (1,619 m)
Category H – Col de Joux Plane (1,691 m)

2017 
The 2017 Tour de France includes 28 mountain passes or summit finishes, categorized HC, 1, or 2.

Stage 5  
Category 1 –  La Planche des Belles Filles (1035 m)

Stage 8  
Category 2 – Côte de Viry (748 m)  
Category 1 – Montée de la Combe de Laisia Les Molunes (1,202 m)

Stage 9  
Category 2 – Côte des Neyrolles (825 m)
Category H – Col de la Biche (1,316 m)
Category H – Grand Colombier (1,501 m)
Category H – Mont du Chat (1,504 m)

Stage 12  
Category 2 – Col des Ares (797 m) 
Category 1 – Col de Menté (1,349 m) 
Category H – Port de Balès (1,755 m) 
Category 1 – Col de Peyresourde (1,569 m) 
Category 2 – Peyragudes (1,580 m)

Stage 13  
Category 2 – Col de Latrape (1,110 m) 
Category 1 – Col d'Agnes (1,570 m) 
Category 1 – Mur de Péguère (1,375 m)

Stage 15  
Category 1 – Montée de Naves d'Aubrac (1,058 m) 
Category 1 – Col de Peyra Taillade (1,190 m)

Stage 17  
 Category 2 – Col d'Ornon (1,371 m) 
 Category H – Col de la Croix de Fer (2,067 m) 
 Category 1 – Col du Télégraphe (1,566 m)
 Category H – Col du Galibier (2,642 m)

Stage 18  
Category 1 – Col de Vars (2,109 m)
Category H – Col d'Izoard (2,360 m)

2018 
The 2018 Tour de France includes 26 mountain passes or summit finishes, categorized HC, 1, or 2.

Stage 10 
 Category 1 – Col de la Croix Fry (1,474 m)
 Category H – Montée du Plateau des Gilères (1,389 m)
 Category 1 – Col de Romme (1,292 m)
 Category 1 – Col de la Colombière (1,604 m)

Stage 11 
 Category H – Montée de Bisanne (1,687 m)
 Category H – Col du Pré (1,742 m)
 Category 2 – Cormet de Roselend (1,978 m)
 Category 1 – La Rosière (1,848 m)

Stage 12 
 Category H – Col de la Madeleine (1,989 m)
 Category 2 – Lacets de Montvernier (780 m)
 Category H – Col de la Croix de Fer (2,067 m)
 Category H – Alpe d'Huez (1831 m)

Stage 14 
 Category 2 – Col de la Croix-de-Berthel (1,089 m)
 Category 2 – Côte de la Croix Neuve (1,051 m)

Stage 15 
 Category 2 – Col de Slé (917 m)
 Category 1 – Pic de Nore (1,201 m)

Stage 16 
 Category 2 – Col de Portet d'Aspet (1,069 m)
 Category 1 – Col de Menté (1,338 m)
 Category 1 – Col du Portillon (1,286 m)

Stage 17 
 Category 1 – Peyragudes (1,640 m)
 Category 1 – Col de Val Louron-Azet (1,531 m)
 Category H – Col de Portet (2,205 m)

Stage 19  
 Category 1 – Col d'Aspin (1,479 m)
 Category H – Col du Tourmalet (2,109 m)
 Category 2 – Col des Bordères (1,160 m) 
 Category H – Col d'Aubisque (1,701 m)

2019 
The 2019 Tour de France includes 27 mountain passes or summit finishes, categorized HC, 1, or 2.

Stage 5 
 Category 2 – Cote du Haut-Koeninsburg (558 m) 
 Category 2 – Col des Trois Epis (659 m)

Stage 6 
 Category 1 – Le Markstein (1,176 m)
 Category 2 – Col du Hunsdruck (746 m)
 Category 1 – Ballon d'Alsace (1,172 m)
 Category 1 – Col des Chevrères (918 m)
 Category 1 – La Planche des Belles Filles (1,139 m)

Stage 8 
 Category 2 – Col de la Croix Montmain (737 m)
 Category 2 – Col de la Croix de Thel (648 m)
 Category 2 – Col de la Croix Paquet (596 m)
 Category 2 – Col de la Croix de Part (736 m)
 Category 2 – Cote d'Aveize (786 m)

Stage 9 
 Category 1 – Mur d'Aurec-sur-Loire (801 m)

Stage 12 
 Category 1 – Col de Peyresourde (1,562 m)
 Category 1 – La Hourquette d'Ancizan (1,557 m)

Stage 14 
 Category 1 – Col du Soulor (1,469 m)
 Category H – Col du Tourmalet (2,114 m)

Stage 15 
 Category 2 – Col de Montségur (1,049 m)
 Category 1 – Port de Lers (1,521 m)
 Category 1 – Col de Péguère (1,352 m)
 Category 1 – Prat d'Albis (1,198 m)

Stage 18  
 Category 1 – Col de Vars (2,104 m)
 Category H – Col d'Izoard (2,361 m)
 Category H – Col du Galibier (2,619 m)

Stage 19  
 Category 2 – Montée d'Aussois (1,519 m)
 Category H – Col de l'Iseran (2,758 m)

Stage 20  
 Category H – Val Thorens (2,363 m)

2020 
The 2020 Tour de France includes 29 mountain passes or summit finishes, categorized HC, 1, or 2.

Stage 2 
 Category 1 – Col de la Colmiane (1,500 m) 
 Category 1 – Col de Turini (1,605 m)
 Category 2 – Col d'Èze (483 m)

Stage 4 
 Category 1 – Orcières-Merlette (1,821 m)

Stage 6 
 Category 1 – Col de la Lusette (1,351 m)

Stage 8 
 Category 1 – Col de Menté (1,349 m) 
 Category H – Port de Balès (1,755 m) 
 Category 1 – Col de Peyresourde (1,569 m)

Stage 9 
 Category 1 – Col de la Hourcère (1,443 m) 
 Category 1 – Col de Marie-Blanque (1,027 m)

Stage 12 
 Category 2 – Suc au May (893 m)

Stage 13 
 Category 1 – Col de Ceyssat (1,074 m)
 Category 2 – Montée de la Stèle (1,244 m)
 Category 2 – Col de Néronne (1,237 m)
 Category 1 – Pas de Peyrol (1,577 m)

Stage 14 
 Category 2 – Col du Béal (1,396 m)

Stage 15 
 Category 1 – Montèe de la Selle de Fromentel (1,173 m)
 Category 1 – Col de la Biche (1,297 m)
 Category H – Grand Colombier (1,495 m)

Stage 16 
 Category 2 – Col de Porte (1,316 m)
 Category 2 – Côte de Revel (760 m)
 Category 1 – Montée de Saint Nizier du Moucherotte (1,169m)

Stage 17 
 Category H – Col de la Madeleine (1,993 m)
 Category H – Col de la Loze (2,301 m)

Stage 18 
 Category 1 – Cormet de Roselend (1,978 m)
 Category 2 – Col des Saisies (1,646 m)
 Category 1 – Col des Aravis (1,485 m)
 Category H – Montée du Plateau des Gilères (1,389 m)

Stage 20 
 Category 1 – La Planche des Belles Filles (1,038 m)

2021 
The 2021 Tour de France includes 27 mountain passes or summit finishes, categorized HC, 1, or 2.

Stage 7 
 Category 2 – Signal d'Uchon (633 m)

Stage 8 
 Category 1 – Côte de Mont-Saxonnex (957 m)
 Category 1 – Col de Romme (1,292 m)
 Category 1 – Col de la Colombière (1,605 m)

Stage 9 
 Category 2 – Côte de Domancy (798 m)
 Category 1 – Col des Saisies (1,648 m)
 Category H – Col du Pré (1,730 m)
 Category 2 – Cormet de Roselend (1971 m)
 Category 1 – Tignes (2084 m)

Stage 11 
 Category 1 – Col de la Liguière (982 m)
 Category 1 – Mont Ventoux (1,894 m)
 Category H – Mont Ventoux (1,894 m)

Stage 14 
 Category 2 – Col de Montségur (1,046 m)
 Category 2 – Col de la Croix des Morts (902 m)
 Category 2 – Col de Saint-Louis (705 m)

Stage 15 
 Category 1 – Montée de Mont-Louis (1,563 m)
 Category 2 – Col de Puymorens (1,914 m)
 Category 1 – Port d'Envalira (2,406 m)
 Category 1 – Col de Beixalis (1,797 m)

Stage 16 
 Category 2 – Col de Port (1,255 m)
 Category 1 – Col de la Core (1,395 m)
 Category 2 – Col de Portet d'Aspet (1,066 m)

Stage 17 
 Category 1 – Col de Peyresourde (1,571 m)
 Category 1 – Col de Val Louron-Azet (1,531 m)
 Category H – Col de Portet (2,209 m)

Stage 18 
 Category H – Col du Tourmalet (2,115 m)
 Category H – Luz Ardiden (1,720 m)

2022 
The 2022 Tour de France includes 23 mountain passes or summit finishes, categorized HC, 1, or 2.

Stage 7 
 Category 1 – La Super Planche des Belles Filles (1,140 m)

Stage 9 
 Category 2 – Col des Mosses (1445 m)
 Category 1 – Col de la Croix (1778 m)
 Category 1 – Pas de Morgins (1377 m)

Stage 10 
 Category 2 – Montée de l'altiport de Megève (1382 m)

Stage 11 
 Category 2 – Lacets de Montvernier (782 m)
 Category 1 – Col du Télégraphe (1566 m)
 Category H – Col du Galibier (2642 m)
 Category H – Col du Granon (2413 m)

Stage 12 
 Category H – Col du Galibier (2642 m)
 Category H – Col de la Croix de Fer (2068 m)
 Category H – Alpe d'Huez (1850 m)

Stage 13 
 Category 2 – Col de Parménie (571 m)

Stage 14 
 Category 2 – Côte de la Croix Neuve (Montée Laurent Jalabert) (1030 m)

Stage 16 
 Category 1 – Port de Lers (1517 m)
 Category 1 – Mur de Péguère (1375 m)

Stage 17 
 Category 1 – Col d'Aspin (1490 m)
 Category 2 – La Hourquette d'Ancizan (1,566 m)
 Category 1 – Col de Val Louron-Azet (1,580 m)
 Category 1 – Peyragudes (1580 m)

Stage 18 
 Category H – Col d'Aubisque (1709 m)
 Category 1 – Col de Spandelles (1378 m)
 Category H – Hautacam (1520 m)

References

Stage by stage 2009 LeTour.com
Stage by stage 2010 LeTour.com

Tour de France-related lists
 Tour de France
Tour de France Mountain
Lists of landforms of France
Tour de France